Drosanthemum hispidum, the hairy dewflower, is a species of perennial herb in the family Aizoaceae (stone plants). They are succulent plants and have a self-supporting growth form and simple, broad leaves. Flowers are visited by Colletes schultzei.

D. hispidum contains the alkaloid 4'-O-demethylmesembrenol structurally related to alkaloids in Kanna (Sceletium tortuosum).

Sources

References 

hispidum